Donelapalem is a village in Rajavommangi Mandal, Alluri Sitharama Raju district in the state of Andhra Pradesh in India.

Geography 

Demographics 
 India census, Donelapalem had a population of 545, out of which 273 were male and 272 were female. The population of children below 6 years of age was 6%. The literacy rate of the village was 49%.

References 

Villages in Rajavommangi mandal